Désiré Olivier Bourbeau (21 September 1834 – 21 December 1900) was a Canadian politician and merchant.

The son of L. Bourbeau and Édesse Gauvreau, Bourbeau established himself as a merchant in Victoriaville. He married M.B. Bouchard. Bourbeau was a director of the Arthabaska Building Society, the Arthabaska Agricultural Society and the Mutual Insurance Company. He was elected to the House of Commons of Canada in 1877 in a by-election as a Member of the Conservative Party to represent the riding of Drummond—Arthabaska. He was re-elected in 1878 and 1882. Besides his federal political career, he was also mayor of Arthabaska, Quebec.

References

External links
 

1834 births
1900 deaths
Conservative Party of Canada (1867–1942) MPs
Members of the House of Commons of Canada from Quebec
Mayors of Victoriaville
Place of death missing